Diocese of Irkutsk may refer to the following ecclesiastical jurisdictions with see in Irkutsk, in southern central Siberia :

 Roman Catholic Diocese of Saint Joseph at Irkutsk
 Russian Orthodox Metropolitate of Irkutsk